Dudley Bowen (26 September 1903 – 9 March 1972) was a South African cricketer. He played in one first-class match for Border in 1925/26.

See also
 List of Border representative cricketers

References

External links
 

1903 births
1972 deaths
South African cricketers
Border cricketers
Cricketers from East London, Eastern Cape